Halorhabdus tiamatea is  a halophilic archaeon isolated from the Red Sea. With its extremely high salinity optimum of 27% NaCl, Halorhabdus has one of the highest reported salinity optima of any living organism.

Genome structure
The genome of Halorhabdus was sequenced in August 2014. The G + C content of its DNA is estimated to be 64%.

References

Further reading

Scientific books

Scientific databases

Archaea genera
Archaea described in 2008